Shahpura is a town and a nagar panchayat in Jabalpur district in the Indian state of Madhya Pradesh.

Geography
It has an average elevation of 381 metres (1249 feet).

Demographics
 India census, Shahpura had a population of 11,961. Males constitute 52% of the population and females 48%. Shahpura has an average literacy rate of 72%, higher than the national average of 59.5%: male literacy is 77%, and female literacy is 67%. In Shahpura, 14% of the population is under 6 years of age.

References

Cities and towns in Jabalpur district